Sheas Lake is a lake in Le Sueur County, in the U.S. state of Minnesota.

Sheas Lake was named for Timothy Shea, a pioneer who settled there.

References

Lakes of Minnesota
Lakes of Le Sueur County, Minnesota